The Russell Midcap Index measures performance of the 800 smallest companies (approximately 27% of total capitalization) in the Russell 1000 Index. , the stocks of the Russell Midcap Index have a weighted average market capitalization of approximately $22.64 billion, median market capitalization of $9.91 billion, and the market capitalization of the largest company is $54.74 billion. The index, which was launched on November 1, 1991, is maintained by FTSE Russell, a subsidiary of the London Stock Exchange Group. 

Its ticker symbol is ^RMCC.

Investing
The Russell Midcap Index is tracked by an ETF, iShares Russell Mid-Cap.

Annual returns

Top 10 holdings
ServiceNow
Analog Devices
Fidelity National Information Services
Edwards Lifesciences
Sempra Energy
Roper Technologies
Worldpay, Inc.
Fiserv
Ross Stores
Dollar General

(as of June 30, 2019)

Top sectors by weight
Financial Services
Technology
Consumer Discretionary
Producer Durables
Health Care

See also
S&P 400
Russell Investments
Russell 2000 Index
Russell 1000 Index

References

External links
Russell page on Russell Midcap
Russell Indexes
Russell Investment Group
Index Construction and Methodology
Yahoo! Finance page for ^RMCC

American stock market indices